Regional Council elections were held in Réunion in 1998 as part of the French regional elections. The Communist Party of Réunion–Socialist Party–Miscellaneous left alliance emerged as the largest faction in the Council, winning 19 of the 45 seats.

Results

References

Reunion
Reunion
Elections in Réunion
1998 in Réunion
Election and referendum articles with incomplete results